Delwyn Anne Costello (14 January 1960 – 4 August 2018) was a New Zealand cricketer who played as a right-arm medium bowler. She appeared in 1 Test match and 7 One Day Internationals for New Zealand in 1985. She played domestic cricket for Canterbury.

References

External links

1960 births
2018 deaths
Cricketers from Wellington City
New Zealand women cricketers
New Zealand women Test cricketers
New Zealand women One Day International cricketers
Canterbury Magicians cricketers